Megan Dykeman is a Canadian politician, who was elected to the Legislative Assembly of British Columbia in the 2020 British Columbia general election. She represents the electoral district of Langley East as a member of the British Columbia New Democratic Party.

Electoral record

References

21st-century Canadian politicians
21st-century Canadian women politicians
British Columbia New Democratic Party MLAs
Women MLAs in British Columbia
Living people
Year of birth missing (living people)